Amnat Charoen is a town in Thailand, the capital of Amnat Charoen Province. It occupies parts of the sub-district Bung of Mueang Amnat Charoen District. The town is 590 km east-northeast of Bangkok.

References

External links

https://web.archive.org/web/20101228234849/http://amnatmu.net/ Website of town (Thai)

Populated places in Amnat Charoen province
Cities and towns in Thailand
Isan